Anandavadi is a village in the Sendurai taluk of Ariyalur district, Tamil Nadu, India.  It is also a Ashram in South India Anandavadi (Ashram)

Demographics 

As per the 2001 census, Anandavadi had a total population of 3854 with 1893 males and 1961 females.

References 

Villages in Ariyalur district

ta:ஆனந்தவாடி